Markus Rusek (born 23 December 1993) is an Austrian professional footballer who plays for Grazer AK.

Club career
On 13 May 2021, he reached agreement on a transfer to Grazer AK.

References

External links

 
 

1993 births
Footballers from Vienna
Living people
Austrian footballers
Association football midfielders
FC Admira Wacker Mödling players
SV Horn players
SC Wiener Neustadt players
SK Austria Klagenfurt players
Grazer AK players
Austrian Football Bundesliga players
2. Liga (Austria) players